There are a number of national parks within Lapland Province in Finland, as well as in Swedish Lapland in the western parts of Västerbotten County and Norrbotten County. The Laponian area is a UNESCO World Heritage Site.


Northern Lapland within Norrbotten County
National parks:
Abisko
Muddus
Padjelanta
Pieljekaise
Sarek
Stora Sjöfallet
Vadvetjåkka

Southern Lappland within Västerbotten County
National parks:
Björnlandet

Eastern Lappland within Lapland Province
National parks:
Pyhä-Luosto National Park
Lemmenjoki National Park
Pallas-Yllästunturi National Park
Urho Kekkonen National Park

See also
Geography of Norrbotten (province)
Geography of Österbotten
Geography of Västerbotten
Lappmarken

Sápmi